Ivan Kytsenko is a Paralympian athlete from Ukraine competing mainly in category F12 long and triple jump events.

Biography
Ivan has competed and medaled in three Paralympics starting in Sydney in 2000 where he won a silver in the F13 long jump but missed out on the pentathlon.  Four years later in 2004 in Athens having been classified as F12 he missed out in the long jump but did pick up a bronze medal in the triple jump.  In his third games in Beijing he won his third medal, a silver, in the F12 triple jump.

External links
 

Paralympic athletes of Ukraine
Athletes (track and field) at the 2000 Summer Paralympics
Athletes (track and field) at the 2004 Summer Paralympics
Athletes (track and field) at the 2008 Summer Paralympics
Paralympic silver medalists for Ukraine
Paralympic bronze medalists for Ukraine
Living people
Medalists at the 2000 Summer Paralympics
Medalists at the 2004 Summer Paralympics
Medalists at the 2008 Summer Paralympics
Year of birth missing (living people)
Paralympic medalists in athletics (track and field)